is an action role-playing game developed and published by Idea Factory with the assistance of Compile Heart. It is the third installment in the Hyperdimension Neptunia franchise. Set in the year 1989, the story takes place after Hyperdimension Neptunia Mk2 in an alternate dimension to Gamindustri, bringing more insight to the "Console War" story arc. The game was released in Japan in August 2012 and in North America and Europe in 2013.

A portable remaster for the PlayStation Vita, titled Hyperdimension Neptunia Re;Birth3: V Century was released in Japan in December 2014, and worldwide under the subtitle of V Generation in 2015.

Gameplay

The gameplay is similar to its predecessor, Hyperdimension Neptunia Mk2, with one exception. The AP bar is gone so now characters can customize their combos but they are limited to one combo per turn. CPU's and Candidates can activate Hard Drive Divinity at the cost of 20% of their SP. Also included is the EXE Drive Gauge which fills up by the number of hits in a combo. This gauge can be expanded upon three times for a total of four gauges. When the gauge is full, characters can utilize an EXE drive, which is the equivalent of a special move. Joint attacks cost more than one section of the gauge. In the remake, the EXE drive gauge is gone, so Special moves cost all SP, which is limited to 1,000.

Music
The music for the game was composed by Kenji Kaneko. Nobuo Uematsu, along with his band Earthbound Papas, and Kenji Ito also contributed four songs each.

The opening theme song of the Hyperdimension Neptunia Re;Birth 3: V Century remake is titled "Rave:tech(^_^)New;world", with vocals performed by nao and written by Shinchiro Yamashita, track composed by Ryu, and guitar by Demetori.

Reception

Original version

The original version received mixed reviews. It received an aggregated score of 55/100 on Metacritic based on 19 reviews.

Remake version

The remake received mixed reception, according to review aggregator Metacritic.

See also
 Hyperdimension Neptunia: The Animation

References

External links
Official website
V Generation official website

2012 video games
Action role-playing video games
Cold War video games
Compile Heart games
Felistella games
Hyperdimension Neptunia games
Nippon Ichi Software games
PlayStation 3 games
PlayStation Vita games
Role-playing video games
Science fantasy video games
Single-player video games
Video game sequels
Video games developed in Japan
Video games featuring female protagonists
Video games scored by Kenji Ito
Video games scored by Nobuo Uematsu
Video games set in 1989
Video games set in the 1980s
Video games with alternate endings
Windows games